Ang mo or ang moh (Hokkien POJ: âng-mô͘ / âng-mn̂g;) is a descriptor used to refer to white people. It is used mainly in Malaysia and Singapore, and sometimes in Thailand and Taiwan. It literally means "red-haired" and originates from Hokkien, a variety of Southern Min.

Other similar terms include ang mo kow, ang mo kui, ang mo lang ( / ). Although the term has historically had some derogatory connotations, it has entered common parlance as a neutral term  in Singapore and Malaysia, where it refers to a white person or, when used as an adjective, Western culture in general.

Etymology and history
The earliest origin for the term ang mo could be traced to the contact between Hokkien (Southern Min) speakers in southern Fujian with the Portuguese Empire and Dutch East India Company during the Haijin ("Sea Ban") period in the 16th and 17th century.  One of the earliest known uses of the term in writing is found in the early 1600s Selden Map, which labels the Maluku Islands of Indonesia with ang mo, likely referring to the Dutch presence there.

During the 17th century, the Dutch East India Company failed in its attempt to force their way into Fujian to trade in the 1620s during the Sino-Dutch conflicts and were called ang mo by the locals. The Dutch East India Company and then the Spanish Empire had colonized Taiwan and the Spanish built Fort San Domingo in Tamsui, Taiwan. The Dutch later drove the Spanish out and seized the Fort which also became known as "City of the Red-Haired" in Taiwanese Hokkien. Dutch people were known in Taiwan as ang mo lang ("red-haired people") in Taiwanese Hokkien. This is most likely because red hair is a relatively common trait among the Dutch. This historical term ang mo lang continues to be used in the context of Taiwanese history to refer to Dutch people.

The Chinese characters for ang mo are the same as those in the historical Japanese term , which was used during the Edo period (1603–1868) as an epithet for (Northwestern Europeans) white people. It primarily referred to Dutch traders who were the only Europeans allowed to trade with Japan during the Sakoku, its 200-year period of isolation.

During the 19th century, Walter Henry Medhurst made a reference in his academic work A Dictionary of the Hok-Këèn Dialect of the Chinese Language that âng mô ("red haired"), generally applied to the English people. With the large migration of the Hoklo to Southeast Asia, predominantly Malaysia and Singapore, the term ang moh became more widespread and was used to refer to white people in general.

Racial controversy
The term ang mo is usually viewed as racist and derogatory by white people. Despite this, it is a widely used term, at least among non-Westerners. It appears, for instance, in Singaporean newspapers such as The Straits Times, and in television programs and films.

Derogatory context
In Singapore and Malaysia, the term ang mo sai is a derogatory term used within the Chinese community for mocking other Chinese who are not able to read Chinese.

See also
Ang Mo Kio
Barang
Bule
Farang
Gweilo
Mat Salleh

References

External links

Definition from the Coxford Singlish Dictionary
Definition from the Dictionary of Singlish and Singapore English

Pejorative terms for white people
Ethno-cultural designations
Hokkien-language phrases
Singaporean culture
Singlish
Taiwanese culture